This is a list of places in Greece which have standing links to local communities in other countries known as "town twinning" (usually in Europe) or "sister cities" (usually in the rest of the world).

A
Agia Paraskevi

 Geroskipou, Cyprus
 Saint-Brieuc, France

Aigio

 Alba Iulia, Romania
 Capaccio Paestum, Italy
 Kalavryta, Greece

 Kyrenia, Cyprus

Alexandroupoli

 Burgas, Bulgaria
 Lakatamia, Cyprus
 Simferopol, Ukraine
 Sosnovy Bor, Russia
 Vyborg (Saint Petersburg), Russia

Athens

 Ashgabat, Turkmenistan
 Athens, United States
 Barcelona, Spain
 Beijing, China
 Bethlehem, Palestine
 Bucharest, Romania
 Buenos Aires, Argentina
 Chicago, United States
 Cusco, Peru
 Famagusta, Cyprus
 Kyiv, Ukraine
 Ljubljana, Slovenia
 Los Angeles, United States
 Montreal, Canada
 New York City, United States
 Nicosia, Cyprus
 Rio de Janeiro, Brazil
 Seoul, South Korea
 Washington, D.C., United States

C
Chalandri

 Calimera, Italy
 Enfield, England, United Kingdom
 Harbin, China
 Nablus, Palestine

Chania

 Axioupoli, Greece
 Engomi, Cyprus
 Ermoupoli, Greece
 Famagusta, Cyprus
 Karpathos, Greece
 Paphos, Cyprus
 Polis, Cyprus
 Wellington, New Zealand

Corfu

 Asha, Cyprus
 Bar, Montenegro
 Bari, Italy 
 Belgrade, Serbia
 Bethlehem, United States
 Brindisi, Italy
 Carovigno, Italy
 Famagusta, Cyprus
 Ioannina, Greece
 Koper, Slovenia
 Kruševac, Serbia
 Meissen, Germany
 Mytilene, Greece
 Paphos, Cyprus
 Sarandë, Albania
 Tremetousia, Cyprus
 Troisdorf, Germany
 Vathy, Greece

D
Drama

 Lauf an der Pegnitz, Germany

E
Eleusis
 Gela, Italy

H
Heraklion

 Čukarica (Belgrade), Serbia
 Limassol, Cyprus
 Nizhny Novgorod, Russia
 Tampa, United States
 Toledo, Spain

I
Igoumenitsa
 Velbert, Germany

Ilioupoli

 Heliopolis (Cairo), Egypt
 Iași, Romania
 Larnaca, Cyprus
 Novi Sad, Serbia

K
Kalamata

 Aglandjia, Cyprus
 Amioun, Lebanon
 Bizerte, Tunisia
 Lowell, United States
 Missolonghi, Greece
 Râmnicu Vâlcea, Romania
 West Torrens, Australia
 Xi'an, China

Kallithea

 Ferrara, Italy
 Gelendzhik, Russia
 Prague 5 (Prague), Czech Republic
 Sartrouville, France

Kalymnos

 Arles, France
 Chieti, Italy
 Darwin, Australia
 Lakatamia, Cyprus
 Mariupol, Ukraine
 Tarpon Springs, United States

Katerini

 Brăila, Romania
 Čačak, Serbia
 Maintal, Germany
 Moosburg, Austria
 Surgut, Russia

Kavala

 Aranđelovac, Serbia
 Durham, United States
 Gradiška, Bosnia and Herzegovina
 Nuremberg, Germany
 Tarancón, Spain

Keratsini
 Prešov, Slovakia

Kolindros is a member of the Charter of European Rural Communities, a town twinning association across the European Union, alongside with:

 Bienvenida, Spain
 Bièvre, Belgium
 Bucine, Italy
 Cashel, Ireland
 Cissé, France
 Desborough, England, United Kingdom
 Esch (Haaren), Netherlands
 Hepstedt, Germany
 Ibănești, Romania
 Kandava (Tukums), Latvia
 Kannus, Finland
 Lassee, Austria
 Medzev, Slovakia
 Moravče, Slovenia
 Næstved, Denmark
 Nagycenk, Hungary
 Nadur, Malta
 Ockelbo, Sweden
 Pano Lefkara, Cyprus
 Põlva, Estonia
 Samuel (Soure), Portugal
 Slivo Pole, Bulgaria
 Starý Poddvorov, Czech Republic
 Strzyżów, Poland
 Tisno, Croatia
 Troisvierges, Luxembourg
 Žagarė (Joniškis), Lithuania

Komotini

 Kardzhali, Bulgaria
 Yalova, Turkey
 Yıldırım, Turkey

L
Lamia

 Chioggia, Italy
 Mytilene, Greece
 Rzeszów, Poland

Larissa

 Anapa, Russia
 Bălți, Moldova
 Banská Bystrica, Slovakia

 Foča, Bosnia and Herzegovina
 Knoxville, United States
 Kos, Greece
 Larnaca, Cyprus
 Rybnik, Poland
 Stara Zagora, Bulgaria

Laurium

 Aleksinac, Serbia

 Mangalia, Romania
 Oia, Greece
 Plomari, Greece
 Quimper, France

Lefkada

 Emmaboda, Sweden
 Leucate, France
 Nahariya, Israel
 Paralimni, Cyprus
 Ploiești, Romania
 Prymorsky District (Odesa), Ukraine
 Shinjuku (Tokyo), Japan

M
Mouresi

 Aradippou, Cyprus
 Mollaj (Korcë), Albania

Mytilene

 Brod, Bosnia and Herzegovina
 Corfu, Greece
 Kalamaria, Greece
 Lamia, Greece
 Paphos, Cyprus
 Portland, United States
 Preveza, Greece
 Setouchi, Japan

N
Naousa

 Asenovgrad, Bulgaria

 Missolonghi, Greece
 Paros, Greece
 Podgorica, Montenegro
 Zgorzelec, Poland

Nea Anchialos
 Pomorie, Bulgaria

Nea Ionia

 Alanya, Turkey
 Lefkoniko, Cyprus
 Martina Franca, Italy

P
Patmos

 Auderghem, Belgium
 Glastonbury, England, United Kingdom
 Grottaferrata, Italy

Patras

 Banja Luka, Bosnia and Herzegovina
 Bari, Italy
 Byblos, Lebanon
 Bydgoszcz, Poland
 Debrecen, Hungary
 Famagusta, Cyprus
 Gjirokastër, Albania
 Limassol, Cyprus
 Reggio Calabria, Italy
 Saint-Étienne, France
 Santa Barbara, United States
 Savannah, United States
 Wuxi, China

Perdika

 Jagodina, Serbia
 Paraćin, Serbia

Piraeus

 Baltimore, United States
 Galaţi, Romania
 Marseille, France
 Odesa, Ukraine
 Ostrava, Czech Republic
 Rosario, Argentina
 Saint Petersburg, Russia
 Shanghai, China
 Tartus, Syria
 Varna, Bulgaria
 Worcester, United States

Preveza is a member of the Douzelage, a town twinning association of towns across the European Union. Preveza also has other twin towns.

Douzelage
 Agros, Cyprus
 Altea, Spain
 Asikkala, Finland
 Bad Kötzting, Germany
 Bellagio, Italy
 Bundoran, Ireland
 Chojna, Poland
 Granville, France
 Holstebro, Denmark
 Houffalize, Belgium
 Judenburg, Austria
 Kőszeg, Hungary
 Marsaskala, Malta
 Meerssen, Netherlands
 Niederanven, Luxembourg
 Oxelösund, Sweden
 Rokiškis, Lithuania
 Rovinj, Croatia
 Sesimbra, Portugal
 Sherborne, England, United Kingdom
 Sigulda, Latvia
 Siret, Romania
 Škofja Loka, Slovenia
 Sušice, Czech Republic
 Tryavna, Bulgaria
 Türi, Estonia
 Zvolen, Slovakia
Other
 Mytilene, Greece
 Spišská Nová Ves, Slovakia

R
Rethymno

 Ayia Napa, Cyprus
 Castenaso, Italy

Rhodes

 Ávila, Spain
 Conches-en-Ouche, France
 Gotland, Sweden
 Limassol, Cyprus
 New Braunfels, United States
 Perth, Australia
 Pisa, Italy

 Rhode Island, United States
 Roses, Spain
 Valletta, Malta
 Yalta, Ukraine

S
Salamina
 Famagusta, Cyprus

Samos

 Megara, Greece
 Metaponto (Bernalda), Italy

Serres

 Fosses, France
 Petrich, Bulgaria
 Veliko Tarnovo, Bulgaria

Skiathos

 Formentera, Spain
 Newport, United States

Skopelos
 Atarfe, Spain

Sparta

 Lapithos, Cyprus
 Moreland, Australia
 Morphou, Cyprus
 Le Plessis-Trévise, France
 Sopron, Hungary
 Stamford, United States
 Tanagura, Japan
 Taranto, Italy

Spetses
 Bailén, Spain

Syvota
 Locorotondo, Italy

T
Thessaloniki

 Alexandria, Egypt
 Bologna, Italy
 Bratislava, Slovakia
 Busan, South Korea
 Cologne, Germany
 Constanţa, Romania
 Durrës, Albania
 Hartford, United States
 Kolkata, India
 Korçë, Albania
 Leipzig, Germany
 Limassol, Cyprus

 Melbourne, Australia
 Nice, France
 Plovdiv, Bulgaria
 San Francisco, United States
 Tel Aviv, Israel

Triandria

 Bansko, Bulgaria
 Maasmechelen, Belgium
 Mesa Geitonia, Cyprus
 San Giorgio Ionico, Italy

Trikala

 Amberg, Germany
 Antiparos, Greece
 Banan (Chongqing), China

 Castrop-Rauxel, Germany
 Dropull, Albania
 Pyatigorsk, Russia
 Talence, France
 Tucson, United States
 Vranje, Serbia

Tripoli

 Arcadia, United States
 Missolonghi, Greece
 Paralimni, Cyprus
 Peine, Germany

V
Volos

 Antofagasta, Chile
 Batumi, Georgia
 Le Mans, France
 Pleven, Bulgaria
 Rostov-on-Don, Russia
 Smederevo, Serbia

X
Xanthi

 Beşiktaş, Turkey
 Biga, Turkey
 Gifhorn, Germany
 New Belgrade (Belgrade), Serbia
 Smolyan, Bulgaria

Z
Zakynthos

 Kiryat Bialik, Israel
 Limassol, Cyprus
 Pavia, Italy
 Serravalle, San Marino
 Yevpatoria, Ukraine

Zitsa
 Nardò, Italy

References

Greece
Greece geography-related lists
Foreign relations of Greece
Cities and towns in Greece
Populated places in Greece